The Skif Raptor is a Ukrainian single-place paraglider that was designed by Sergei Rozhko and produced by Skif Paragliding of Feodosia. It is now out of production.

The aircraft is not related to the Independence Raptor.

Design and development
The Raptor was designed as an advanced and competition glider. The Raptor 29 model is named for its approximate wing area in square metres.

Operational history
Reviewer Noel Bertrand described the Raptor 29 in a 2003 review as "top of the range".

Specifications (Raptor 29)

References

Raptor
Paragliders